UCA can stand for:

Companies:
 UCA, a manufacturer of rail car movers
 Usine de Construction Aéronautique (UCA), merged into Société Nationale de Constructions Aéronautiques du Sud Ouest

In computing:
 Unicode collation algorithm

In education:
 Université Clermont-Auvergne, a public university in Clermont-Ferrand, France.
 Universal College Application, an online consortium-based college admissions application
 University of Central Arkansas, a public university in Conway, Arkansas, United States
 University for the Creative Arts, England
 Universidad Centroamericana (Managua), a university in Managua, Nicaragua
 Central American University or Universidad Centroamericana "José Simeón Cañas", San Salvador, El Salvador
 University of Cádiz, Spain
 University of Central Asia
 Upper Columbia Academy, Spangle, Washington
 Pontifical Catholic University of Argentina

In health:
 Urgent Care Association

In religion:
 Unitarian Christian Association, UK
 Universalist Church of America, 1866 to 1961
 Uniting Church in Australia

In sports:
 Universal Cheearleaders Association

Other uses:
 UCA, the IATA code for Oneida County Airport
 UCA, a codon for the amino acid serine
 Under color addition

See also
 Uca, the genus of crabs known as fiddler crabs